Colin Buchanan  is the name of:
Colin Buchanan (musician) (born 1964), Australian entertainer
Colin Buchanan (actor) (born 1966), Scottish actor
Colin Buchanan (town planner) (1907–2001), British town planner
Colin Buchanan (bishop) (born 1934), Church of England bishop
Col Buchanan (born 1973), Northern Irish fantasy writer